Studenčice is a village in the Municipality of Radovljica in the Upper Carniola region of Slovenia. The village church is dedicated to Saint Florian.

References

External links
Studenčice vas at Geopedia

Populated places in the Municipality of Radovljica